A gaucho is an Argentine horseman. El Gaucho may refer to:
 El Gaucho, a track on the Wayne Shorter album Adam's Apple
 El Gaucho Martín Fierro, an epic poem by the Argentine writer José Hernández
 El Gaucho y el diablo, a 1952 Argentine film

See also 
 Gaucho (disambiguation)